Le Cartier is a high-rise apartment building in Montreal, Quebec, Canada. It is located at 1115 Sherbrooke Street West at the corner of Peel Street and Sherbrooke Street West in the Golden Square Mile area of Downtown Montreal. When completed in 1964, Le Cartier was the tallest apartment building in Canada and throughout the Commonwealth. It contains four basement floors, four elevators and 188 units.

Le Cartier's architecture is considered to be of international style and its core structure is made of steel. Its construction began in 1963 and was completed in 1964. It was designed by Menkes and Webb. The developer was ACI Property Corporation, led by British peer Henry Cubitt, 4th Baron Ashcombe. After the bankruptcy of ACI Property Corporation in the mid-1960s, Le Cartier was repossessed by the Montreal Trust Company. It was subsequently purchased by René Lépine and Lorne Wesbter in 1969. René Lépine bought the Webster family's shares. 

In December 2020, the Benvenuto Group purchased the building and has since commenced an extensive renovation program.

External Links 
Le Cartier

References

Apartment buildings in Quebec
International style architecture in Canada
Residential buildings completed in 1965
Skyscrapers in Montreal
Residential skyscrapers in Canada
Downtown Montreal
Retail buildings in Canada
Residential buildings in Montreal